Expurgation, also known as bowdlerization, is a form of censorship that involves purging anything deemed noxious or offensive from an artistic work or other type of writing or media.

The term bowdlerization is a pejorative term for the practice, particularly the expurgation of lewd material from books. The term derives from Thomas Bowdler's 1818 edition of William Shakespeare's plays, which he reworked in ways that he felt were more suitable for women and children. He similarly edited Edward Gibbon's Decline and Fall of the Roman Empire.

A fig-leaf edition is such a bowdlerized text, deriving from the practice of covering the genitals of nudes in classical and Renaissance statues and paintings with fig leaves.

Examples

Religious 
 In 1264, Pope Clement IV ordered the Jews of Aragon to submit their books to Dominican censors for expurgation.

Sexual 
 "The Crabfish" (known also as "The Sea Crabb"), an English folk song dating back to the mid-1800s about a man who places a crab into a chamber pot, unbeknownst to his wife, who later uses the pot without looking, and is attacked by the crab. Over the years, sanitized versions of the song were released in which a lobster or crab grabs the wife by the nose instead of by the genitals or that imply the location of the wounds by censoring the rhyming word in the second couplet. For instance, "Children, children, bring the looking glass / Come and see the crayfish that bit your mother's a-face" (arse).
 The 1925 Harvard Press edition of Montaigne's essays (translated by George Burnham Ives) was published without the essays pertaining to sex.
 A Boston-area ban on Upton Sinclair's novel Oil!  owing to a short motel sex scene  prompted the author to assemble a 150-copy fig-leaf edition with the nine offending pages blacked out as a publicity stunt.
 In 1938, a jazz song "Flat Foot Floogie (with a Floy Floy)" peaked at number two on US charts. The original lyrics were sung with the word "floozie", meaning a sexually promiscuous woman, or a prostitute, but record company Vocalion objected. Hence the word was substituted with the almost similar sounding title word "floogie" in the second recording. The "floy floy" in the title was a slang term for a venereal disease, but that was not widely known at the time. In the lyrics it is sung repeatedly "floy-doy", which was widely thought as a nonsense refrain. Since the lyrics were regarded as nonsense the song failed to catch the attention of censors.
 In 1920, an American publisher bowdlerized the George Ergerton translation of Knut Hamsun's Hunger.
Lady Chatterley's Lover by English author D. H. Lawrence. An unexpurgated edition was not published openly in the United Kingdom until 1960.

Racial 
 Recent editions of many works—including Mark Twain's Huckleberry Finn and Joseph Conrad's Nigger of the Narcissus—have found various replacements ("slave", "Indian", "soldier boy", "N-word", "children") for the word nigger. An example of bowdlerization can be plainly seen in Huck Finn, in which Twain used racial slurs in natural speech to highlight what he saw as racism and prejudice endemic to the Antebellum South.
 Agatha Christie’s Ten Little Niggers was dramatised by the BBC under the name And Then There Were None. It was subsequently re-released under this title in the United States, and the short poem which is intrinsic to the plot was changed from Ten Little Niggers to Ten Little Indians.
 The American version of the counting rhyme "Eeny, meeny, miny, moe", which was changed by some to add the word "nigger", is now sung with a different word, such as "tiger".
 The Hardy Boys children's mystery novels (published starting in 1927) contained heavy doses of racism.  They were extensively revised starting in 1959 in response to parents' complaints about racial stereotypes in the books.  For further information, see The Hardy Boys#1959%E2%80%931979.

Cursing 
 Many Internet message boards and forums use automatic wordfiltering to block offensive words and phrases from being published or automatically amend them to more innocuous substitutes such as asterisks or nonsense. This often catches innocent words, in a scenario referred to as the Scunthorpe problem; words such as 'assassinate' and 'classic' may become 'buttbuttinate' or 'clbuttic'. Users frequently self-bowdlerize their own writing by using slight misspellings or variants, such as 'fcuk' or 'pron'.
 The 2010 song "Fuck You" by CeeLo Green, which made the top-10 in thirteen countries, was also broadcast as "Forget You", with a matching music video, where the changed lyrics cannot be lip-read, as insisted by the record company.
Political

 John Nance Garner, the 32nd vice president of the United States, famously referred to the vice presidency as "not worth a bucket of warm piss", but this was bowdlerized to "not worth a bucket of warm spit" for many years.

Other 
 A student edition of the novel Fahrenheit 451 was expurgated to remove a variety of content. This was ironic given the subject matter of the novel involves burning books. This continued for a dozen years before it was brought to author Ray Bradbury's attention and he convinced the publisher to reinstate the material.
 The video game South Park: The Fractured but Whole was originally going to have the name The Butthole of Time. However, marketers would not promote anything with a vulgarity in its title, so "butthole" was replaced with the homophone "but whole".
 In 2023 new versions of Roald Dahl’s books were published by Puffin Books to remove language deemed "inappropriate".  Puffin had hired "sensitivity readers" to go over his texts to make sure the books could "continue to be enjoyed by all today”. the same was done with the James Bond novels.

See also 
 Ad usum Delphini
 Comstockery, after Anthony Comstock
 Censorship
 Minced oath
 Tobacco bowdlerization

References 

Censorship